Santiago Metro Line 2 is one of the seven rapid transit lines that currently make up the Santiago Metro network in Santiago, Chile. It has 22 stations and 20.7 km of track. The line intersects with Line 1 at Los Héroes, with the Line 3 at Puente Cal y Canto, with Line 4A at La Cisterna, with Line 5 at Santa Ana, and Line 6 at Franklin. It will also intersect with the future Line 7 at Puente Cal y Canto. Its distinctive colour on the network map is banana yellow.

In 2015, Line 2 accounted for 18.8% of all trips made on the metro with a daily ridership of 325,400.

History
The first section on Line 2 opened to the public on March 31, 1978 running between Los Héroes and Franklin. Later the same year, in December, the next section opened running between Franklin and Lo Ovalle.

Plans for an extension southeast towards Rodrigo de Araya were postponed after a major earthquake in 1985; in fact, only two stations opened separately at the line's northern end in 1987 (Santa Ana and Puente Cal y Canto). Two decades later, with a change of plans, it was decided that Line 2 would continue northwards instead of southeast, owing to  recent availability of Tunnel Boring Machines, and on September 8, 2004, two further stations opened to the north, Patronato and Cerro Blanco. These stations marked a new feat in Santiago and overall Chilean engineering by building under the Mapocho River and the Costanera Norte freeway. That year, the line was also extended to the south with the opening of El Parrón and La Cisterna.
 
Another section opened in the north on November 25, 2005, running from Cerro Blanco station to Einstein station. Finally, on December 22, 2006, the three most recent stations opened: Vespucio Norte, Zapadores and Dorsal.
 
On October 26, 2009, the express service began to run on Line 2, stopping at certain stations only at peak times, allowing for faster journeys.

On November 2, 2017, line 6 opened to the public, intersecting line 2 with line 6 at Franklin.

On July 30, 2019, the construction of a southward extension began, where 4 new stations will be added; the extension will be operational by 2023, enabling the metro to serve El Bosque and San Bernando, specifically the El Pino hospital in the latter.

In October 2019, a series of protests resulted in damage to the metro network. Line 2 was closed because of a fire in the mezzanine of Vesupcio Norte on October 18, which resulted in moderate damage; a few other stations on Line 2 suffered minor damage. Service on the line was partly restored on October 25 with trains running express between La Cisterna and Zapadores. Full service was restored to Line 2 on November 11. The protests didn't affect the works on the southward extension to San Bernardo.

Communes served by Line 2
This line serves the following communes from North to South:
 Huechuraba (Indirectly)
 Recoleta
 Independencia
 Santiago
 San Miguel
 La Cisterna
 El Bosque (2023)
 San Bernardo (2023)

Tren Expreso  (Express Service) 

The skip-stop express service works during peak hours and allows trains to stop at alternate stations, reducing the number of stops and the duration of journeys. The stations on the line are divided into “green route” stations, “red route” stations and “common” stations (Spanish: estación común), where all trains stop and allow passengers to switch between red and green routes. The express service works from Monday to Friday, between 6am - 9am and 6pm - 9pm.

Red Route Stations  
 Dorsal
 Cementerios
 Patronato
 Parque O'Higgins
 El Llano
 Lo Vial
 Ciudad Del Niño

Green Route Stations 
 Einstein
 Cerro Blanco
 Toesca
 Rondizzoni
 San Miguel
 Departamental
 El Parrón

Common Stations 
There are 8 stations where both red and green route trains stop. They are the busiest stations and give commuters the chance to change between routes.
 Vespucio Norte
 Zapadores
 Puente Cal y Canto   
 Santa Ana 
 Los Héroes 
 Franklin  
 Lo Ovalle
 La Cisterna

Stations 
Line 2 stations from east to west are:

Line 2 data sheet
 Terminal Communes: Recoleta – La Cisterna
 Track:
 Americo Vespucio Avenue: 1 Station
 Recoleta Avenue: 6 stations
 Puente Cal y Canto, Puente Pedestrian Street: 1 station
 Manuel Rodríguez Avenue: 2 stations
 President Jorge Alessandri Avenue: 3 stations
 Gran Avenida José Miguel Carrera: 9 stations
 Padre Hurtado Avenue: 4 stations
 Construction methods:
 Hospital El Pino - Franklin: Underground.
 Rondizzoni: Trench
 Parque O'Higgins: Raised embankment.
 North of Parque O'Higgins: Viaduct.
 Toesca: Trench.
 Los Héroes: Underground.
 Santa Ana: Trench.
 Puente Cal y Canto - Vespucio Norte: Underground.
 Opening dates:
 Los Héroes– Franklin: March 1978
 Franklin – Lo Ovalle: December 1978
 Los Héroes - Puente Cal y Canto: September 1987
 Puente Cal y Canto – Cerro Blanco: September 2004
 Lo Ovalle – La Cisterna: December 2004
 Cerro Blanco – Einstein: November 2005
 Einstein – Vespucio Norte : December 2006
 La Cisterna - Hospital El Pino: 2022

See also 
 List of metro systems
 Rail transport in Chile
 Transantiago
 Rubber-tyred metro

References

External links

 Metro S.A.
 UrbanRail.net/Santiago
 Santiago Metro Map
 Tarjeta Bip! contactless cards
 Plan and Authority of Transit of Santiago de Chile, Transantiago
 Santiago Metro in Wikipedia in Spanish

1975 establishments in Chile
Railway lines in highway medians
 
750 V DC railway electrification